Howard Caygill (born 1958) is a British philosopher.

He has held the position of Professor of Modern European Philosophy at the Centre for Research in Modern European Philosophy (CRMEP), Kingston University since 2011. Previously he had taught at University of East Anglia and Goldsmiths College, University of London.

He is known for his work on Walter Benjamin, Immanuel Kant, Emmanuel Levinas, and Franz Kafka; and concepts such as resistance have influenced fields including political philosophy, aesthetics, literary theory and continental philosophy.

Jay Bernstein has described Caygill as "one of the two or three leading practitioners and exponents of European philosophy in the UK".

Caygill is the Literary Executor of the estate of Gillian Rose.

Bibliography

Books 

 Caygill, Howard (2020). Force and understanding: essays on philosophy and resistance. London: Bloomsbury Academic. 
 Caygill, Howard (2017). Kafka: in light of the accident. London: Bloomsbury Academic. 
 Caygill, Howard (2013). On resistance: a philosophy of defiance. London: Bloomsbury. 
 Caygill, Howard (2002). Levinas and the political. London: Routledge. 
 Caygill, Howard (1998). Walter Benjamin: the colour of experience. London: Routledge. 
 Caygill, Howard (1995). A Kant dictionary. Oxford: Blackwell. 
 Caygill, Howard (1989). Art of judgment. Oxford: Blackwell.

References 

1958 births
Living people
20th-century British philosophers
Academics of Kingston University
Academics of the University of East Anglia
21st-century British philosophers
Continental philosophers